Bill Perkins is an American politician from the state of New York. A Democrat, he served in the New York City Council from the 9th district from 2017 to 2021. The district includes portions of Harlem in Manhattan. Perkins formerly represented the same seat from 1998 to 2005, and was a member of the New York State Senate for the 30th District from 2007 to 2017.

Early life and education
Perkins was born and raised in Harlem, New York, and attended Collegiate School (New York City) on a scholarship before receiving a scholarship to Brown University. He graduated from Brown in 1972.

Political career

New York City Council (1998-2005)
In 1997, Perkins was first elected to the New York City Council, winning the seat easily after losing the Democratic nomination for the Council three times previously. On the Council, Perkins served as Deputy Majority Leader, and championed the lead paint laws that required New York City residences to be tested for hazardous conditions.

New York State Senate (2007-2017)
Term-limited from the Council in 2005, Perkins opted to seek election to the New York State Senate in 2006, where he won.  He was re-elected five times and served for more ten years before resigning to retake his seat on the New York City Council. Perkins also ran briefly to succeed Charles Rangel in the United States House of Representatives in 2016, but later dropped out.

In 2015 Perkins, was one of a number of Black activists who met with Venezuelan president, Nicolás Maduro in Harlem. He was quoted as saying, “We recognize that in the person of Nicolás Maduro, the president of Venezuela, we have an exceptional leader!”

Perkins was one of the few New York lawmakers who endorsed Bernie Sanders, not Hillary Clinton, in the 2016 Democratic Party presidential primaries.

New York City Council (2017-2021)
In 2016, Councilmember Inez Dickens, who had succeeded Perkins on the New York City Council, announced that she would forgo her last year on the Council to run for a vacant seat in the New York State Assembly. After Dickens won the Assembly seat, New York City Mayor Bill de Blasio called a February 14, 2017 special election to fill her vacated seat on the City Council. Perkins announced that he would be a candidate and won the election with over 33% of the vote. He was sworn into office on March 1, 2017.

Perkins won a full four-year term in the November 2017 general election.

On January 31, 2019, Perkins was transported to the hospital by authorities "after neighbors called the police on him for acting erratically in his Manhattan home". At the time, the Daily News reported that Perkins was receiving treatment for colon cancer and that various constituents and colleagues had expressed concern about his health and his continued fitness to hold public office. In June 2021, Gothamist published a piece on Perkins entitled "As Worries Persist Over Harlem Lawmaker's Health, Elected Leaders Stay Mum".

Perkins sought re-election to the City Council in 2021. The June 22, 2021 Democratic primary in Council District 9 was so close that a recount was held. On August 9, 2021, Perkins conceded the primary election to Kristin Richardson Jordan, a democratic socialist, and announced that he would retire at the end of the year.

See also
 2009 New York State Senate leadership crisis

Further reading
Paterson, David "Black, Blind, & In Charge: A Story of Visionary Leadership and Overcoming Adversity." New York, New York, 2020

References

External links
New York City Councilmember Bill Perkins (official site)
Bill Perkins for City Council (campaign site)

Living people
Democratic Party New York (state) state senators
New York City Council members
African-American state legislators in New York (state)
Brown University alumni
1950 births
21st-century American politicians
David Paterson
Collegiate School (New York) alumni
African-American New York City Council members